Benjamin Griffey House is a historic home located at Gregg Township, Union County, Pennsylvania.  It was built about 1886, and is a -story, rectangular stuccoed brick dwelling with a rear ell, in a Late Victorian style.  It features a two-story bay window with flanking porches and a steep pitched gable.

It was listed on the National Register of Historic Places in 1978. The house was badly damaged in a fire in 1980. As of December 2012, the house is still in the original location.

References

Houses on the National Register of Historic Places in Pennsylvania
Houses completed in 1886
Houses in Union County, Pennsylvania
National Register of Historic Places in Union County, Pennsylvania